The 2021 Elon Phoenix football team represented Elon University as a member of the Colonial Athletic Association (CAA) in the 2021 NCAA Division I FCS football season. The Phoenix, led by third-year head coach Tony Trisciani, played their home games at Rhodes Stadium.

Schedule

References

Elon
Elon Phoenix football seasons
Elon Phoenix football